= Muborak Mansurova =

Tajikistani biologist

Muborak Umarovna Mansurova (Tajik: Муборак Умаровна Мансурова) (born 11 September 1920) was a Tajikistani biologist.

Born in Bukhara, Mansurova graduated in 1942 with a degree in biology from the Central Asian Institute in Tashkent; she returned to Bukhara after graduation, and for a time worked on a silkworm farm. In 1946 she became Director of Silkworm Production. Later she became instructor of anatomy and zoology at the Institute of Agriculture of Tajikistan. In 1969 she became director of the Department of Anatomy and Histology of the same institution. She received a doctorate in biology in 1973, with a dissertation entitled Changes in the Specifics of the Anatomy, Histology, Chemistry, and Physiology of the Skeletal Frame of Hisari Sheep with Respect to Aging, and the following year was named professor. Her primary field of research is the morphology of domesticated animals; among her other publications is The Chemical Bone Structure of the Various Types of Sheep Raised in Tajikistan (Dushanbe, 1960), and in 1974 she began work on a study of the Pamiri bison. For many years she chaired the Council of Women at the university, beginning at its formation. During her career Mansurova received a number of awards for her work, among them the Order of the Badge of Honour.
